TV Sports: Basketball is a 1989 computer basketball game for the home computers. It was developed by Cinemaware and published by Mirrorsoft for the Amiga, MS-DOS, Commodore 64 and TurboGrafx-16. It is part of the TV Sports series that included TV Sports: Baseball as well as other games based on hockey and American football.

Cinemaware later re-released the game as freeware.

Gameplay
The game features five-a-side basketball matches. Players can either play against computer (controlling the players or a coach) or with another person (in versus or cooperative mode). When playing the human could choose to control the same player during the whole match or the one currently in possession of the ball.

The game shows a vertical view and has no NBA license. The in-game perspective is from half-court. When the ball crosses half-court, a short cutscene plays showing the players running to the other side of the court as the game transitions to the opposing basket.

Reception
Computer Gaming World said that TV Sports Basketball had good sound and graphics, and favorably noted its four-player option.

In the May 1990 edition of Games International, Mike Siggins complimented the "slick graphics and arcade/strategy options." But he found the manual "inexplicably vague". He concluded by giving the game an above average rating of 8 out of 10 for game play, and an excellent rating of 9 out of 10 for graphics, saying, "it doesn't quite recreate the speed and excitement of a real game. However, there is sufficient variety and structure to make this game worth persevering with. Just don't expect a classic."

References

External links

Basketball Rules
TV Sports Basketball at hol.abime.net

1989 video games
DOS games
Amiga games
Commodore 64 games
TurboGrafx-16 games
Basketball video games
Video games developed in the United States
Mirrorsoft games